Glastonbury Lake Village was an Iron Age village, situated on a crannog or man made island in the Somerset Levels, near Godney, some  north west of Glastonbury in the southwestern English county of Somerset. It has been designated as a scheduled monument.

It has been described as "the best preserved prehistoric village ever found in the United Kingdom". It was first constructed 250 B.C. by laying down timber and clay. Wooden houses and barns were then built on the clay base and occupied by up to 200 people at any time until the village was abandoned around 50 B.C.

The site was discovered by Arthur Bulleid in 1892 and excavated over the next 15 years. Artefacts uncovered include wooden and metal objects, many of which are now on display at The Tribunal in Glastonbury High Street, and in the Museum of Somerset in Taunton. Much of the timber was left at the site and soil put back on top of it as the best way to preserve it. Surveys in the late 20th and early 21st century have shown this to be effective, however the site is still at risk because of the risk of further drying out of the soil.

History 

The village was first built circa 250 B.C. and occupied until approximately 50 B.C. when it was abandoned, possibly due to a rise in the water level. It was built on a morass on an artificial foundation of timber filled with brushwood, bracken, rubble and clay.

The village housed people in five to seven groups of round houses, each for an extended family, with sheds and barns, made of hazel and willow covered with reeds, and surrounded either permanently or at certain times by a wooden palisade. There were gaps in the palisade and is believed by Minnitt and Coles to have been used to stabilise the clay floors rather than for defensive purposes. At its maximum occupation the village may have had 15 houses in use with a population of up to 200 people. Two distinct phases of occupation have been identified. Early houses were timber framed square or rectangular and built of oak but later buildings were circular huts. Some of the clay spreads were used for barns or animal enclosures rather than houses.

The village was close to the old course of the River Brue and was thought to be surrounded by water, hence the title "Lake Village"; however more recent work suggests the title Swamp Village may be more appropriate as for most of the year the surrounding land was not open water. The Brue was an important water-borne trade route from central Somerset to the Severn Estuary. Despite the wet surroundings vegetable and small domesticated and wild mammals, including beaver and otter, made up more of the diet than fish. The remains of wheat, barley and beans have also been recovered.

Excavation 

The lake village, a crannog or man made island, was discovered in 1892 by local medical student Arthur Bulleid, whose father was a local mayor and the founder of the Glastonbury Antiquarian Society. Bulleid had heard about the lake villages in Switzerland and believed similar sites could be found in his native Somerset.

The excavation of the area began in 1892 and continued over the next 15 years, uncovering the extent of the settlement and publishing the results. From 1892 until 1899 Bulleid worked with labourers for six months of each year and spent the other six months describing and cataloguing the finds. He then left the site to complete his medical studies and returned in 1904 with Harold St George Gray to continue the excavation until 1907. The curator of the Taunton museum of the Somerset Archaeological and Natural History Society, Gray had been trained in archaeological techniques by the archaeologist Augustus Pitt Rivers.

They found remains of the village. The whole site was surrounded by a wooden palisade made from Alder. Each of the finds from large timber to small fragments of pottery were drawn and described with some also being photographed. In 1909 the site was visited by George V while he was the Prince of Wales, along with his wife. They were given a silver replica of the Glastonbury Bowl.

Much of the timber was reburied as the best way of preserving it, and a survey in 2005 found this to have been quite successful, despite reports warning of the area drying out and the peat coverage being reduced. The site is included in the Heritage at Risk Register produced by English Heritage because of the risk to the buried timbers if the site dries out further.

Small scale excavations were later carried out on the site by Michael Avery (unpublished), the Somerset Levels Project, Somerset County Council Heritage Service and the South West Heritage Trust. A film is available about the most recent excavations.

The landscape of the settlement has been modelled in 3D and turned into a short film. A replica of the canoe from the site has also been made and launched.

Artefacts 

The site and the finds from it are the property of the Glastonbury Antiquarian Society. Many of the finds from the site are on display in the Glastonbury Lake Village Museum at The Tribunal in Glastonbury High Street, and in the Museum of Somerset in Taunton. The burial sites of ten new born babies were uncovered, but there was no evidence of the interment of adults from the village.

The artefacts recovered include fragments of pottery, charcoal, bone and a whetstone (a stone for sharpening blades). Later, on excavation, spinning whorls and weaving combs were found, suggesting textile production, although this may have been for domestic use rather than industry. Evidence of bronze-casting and iron-smelting were found. Fine jewellery made from bronze bone have also been found showing a high degree of craftsmanship. Files and hammer heads were examined by metallography which showed that carbon compositions were found to be generally low. In 1905 an early British tin coin was discovered, believed to be from the 1st century A.D, which was sent to the British Museum. Various other objects from the excavation are also held by the British Museum.

Bronze bowl 

The metal "Glastonbury Bowl" was made from two sections riveted together and repaired several times over its life. The bottom half has been dated as having been constructed in the Iron Age. The upper half was probably added in the 1st century from one sheet of metal, which may have been previously used for another purpose, and the two-halves riveted together.

Wooden objects 
The site yielded a number of wooden objects preserved in the peaty soil including five wheel spokes and an unfinished nave to be used as the hub of a wheel. A wooden frame for stretching animal skins were also recovered along with a shaker and dice made from antlers.

Representations of the houses were recreated at the nearby Peat Moors Centre, run by Somerset County Council, before its closure in 2009.

See also 
 List of hillforts and ancient settlements in Somerset

References

Bibliography

External links 

 The Glastonbury Lake Village, a full description of the excavations and the relics discovered, Vol. 2 (Book by Bulleid & Gray)
 Video from South West Heritage Trust about the excavation of the site

History of Somerset
Somerset Levels
Iron Age sites in Somerset
Archaeological sites in Somerset
Former populated places in Somerset
Scheduled monuments in Mendip District
Structures on the Heritage at Risk register in Somerset
1892 archaeological discoveries